The 2023 Walsh Cup was an early-season inter-county hurling competition based in the Irish province of Leinster.

Five other teams from Leinster and Ulster played in the second-ranked 2023 Kehoe Cup.

It took place in January and February 2023. The new floodlights at Wexford Park were first used on 21 January 2023 for the – game.  were the winners, defeating  in the final.

Competition format
The teams are drawn into two groups of four teams. Each team plays the other teams in their group once, earning 2 points for a win and 1 for a draw. The group winners advance to the final.

Results

Group A

Group B

Final

This game is also part of the 2023 National Hurling League.

References

Walsh Cup
Walsh Cup
Walsh Cup (hurling)